Muyal Jol was the sixth ruler of Copan.

Notes

References

5th-century monarchs in North America
Rulers of Copán
504 deaths
Year of birth missing
5th century in the Maya civilization